Sergei Anatolyevich Starostin (March 24, 1953 – September 30, 2005) was a Russian historical linguist and philologist, perhaps best known for his reconstructions of hypothetical proto-languages, including his work on the controversial Altaic theory, the formulation of the Dené–Caucasian hypothesis, and the proposal of a Borean language of still earlier date. He was also the author of a widely respected reconstruction of Old Chinese.

Theories 

In 1986, Starostin and Igor M. Diakonoff suggested that the Hurro-Urartian languages belong to the Northeast Caucasian language family. Starostin was also instrumental in the reconstruction of Proto-Kiranti, Proto-Tibeto-Burman, Proto-Yeniseian, Proto-North-Caucasian, and Proto-Altaic. He developed the hypothesis, originated by Abu al-Ghazi Bahadur Khan in the 17th century, but really revived by Gustaf John Ramstedt in the early 20th century, that Japanese is related to the Turkic and Mongolic languages through an "Altaic" family.

The Dené–Caucasian hypothesis proposes that Northwest Caucasian, Northeast Caucasian, Yeniseian, Sino-Tibetan, and Na-Dené form a single, higher-order language family. According to Starostin, the Dené–Caucasian and Austric macrofamilies, together with the Nostratic macrofamily (as envisaged by Vladislav Illich-Svitych, with some modifications), can further be linked at an earlier stage, which Starostin called the Borean (i.e. 'Northern') languages.

Evolution of Human Languages project 

Since 1985, Starostin had been developing STARLING, a database management system designed for his  website. He was assisted in his work by Murray Gell-Mann, a Nobel Prize-winning physicist. At the time of his death, he was a professor at the Russian State University for the Humanities, a visiting professor at the Santa Fe Institute, and a frequent guest lecturer at Leiden University in the Netherlands, where he was awarded the degree of doctor honoris causa in June 2005.

Starostin died of a heart attack on September 30, 2005 in Moscow after a lecture at the Russian State University for the Humanities.  His son, Georgiy Starostin, is also a linguist.

Selected works
 1986. Co-authored with Igor M. Diakonoff. Hurro-Urartian as an Eastern Caucasian Language. Munich: R. Kitzinger.
 1991. Altajskaja problema i proisxoždenie japonskogo jazyka, 'The Altaic Problem and the Origin of the Japanese Language'. Moscow: Nauka.
1995. "The historical position of Bai". Moskovskij Lingvisticheskij Zhurnal 1, 174-190. Moscow.
 2003. Co-authored with Anna V. Dybo and Oleg A. Mudrak. An Etymological Dictionary of the Altaic Languages, 3 volumes. Leiden: Brill. .
 2005. Co-authored with Svetlana Burlak "Comparative linguistics". .

See also
Moscow School of Comparative Linguistics

Notes

References

External links 
 The Tower of Babel, a large linguistics database built largely by Sergei and George Starostin

1953 births
2005 deaths
20th-century linguists
Corresponding Members of the Russian Academy of Sciences
Historical linguists
Linguists from Russia
Linguists from the Soviet Union
Linguists of Altaic languages
Linguists of Borean languages
Linguists of Caucasian languages
Linguists of Dené–Caucasian languages
Linguists of Etruscan
Linguists of Hurro-Urartian languages
Linguists of Na-Dene languages
Linguists of North Caucasian languages
Linguists of Nostratic languages
Linguists of Sino-Tibetan languages
Long-range comparative linguists
Moscow School of Comparative Linguistics
Moscow State University alumni
Paleolinguists
People from Santa Fe, New Mexico
Academic staff of the Russian State University for the Humanities
Santa Fe Institute people